Hendrella basalis is a species of tephritid or fruit flies in the genus Hendrella of the family Tephritidae.

Distribution
Kazakhstan to East Russia, Mongolia, China.

References

Tephritinae
Insects described in 1927
Diptera of Asia